Pee Wee Point is a cape in Berkeley County, West Virginia, in the United States.

The Tuscarora Trail passes over Pee Wee Point.

References

Landforms of Berkeley County, West Virginia